Priscilla Dorsey Ridgely (July 12, 1762 – ) was First Lady of Maryland.

Early life 
Priscilla Dorsey Ridgely was born on July 12, 1762 in Anne Arundel County.

Career 
She managed the Hampton Mansion. In 1782, she married Charles Carnan Ridgely, who was Governor of Maryland from 1816 to 1819. She was a Methodist elder.

Death and legacy 
Priscilla Dorsey Ridgely died on 30 April 1814 in Baltimore County.

References 

Created via preloaddraft
1762 births
1814 deaths
Ridgely family